A Quadrille dress is a bespoke dress worn by women in Caribbean countries.  The quadrille dress is the folk costume of Jamaica, Dominica and Haiti. It is known by a different name in each country. The dress is particularly worn during the quadrille dance, but also other occasions.

Jamaica
In Jamaica, the quadrille dress is made of cotton. It's called a bandana skirt.  The skirt is worn with a ruffled sleeve blouse and a matching head tie. 

The quadrille is only danced in Jamaica and Trinidad today as a shows 

The bush jacket is hardly traditional.  It was introduced for political reasons in the 1970s. 

One would not expect to see the folk costume at a wedding.  The groom would wear a conventional suit, the bride a fashionable white grown.  

The only occasion where a man would wear a madras shirt and white trousers would be if he were performing on the stage, either singing traditional folk songs or some sort of calypso or mento in the tourist circuit.

Haiti
In Haiti, the quadrille dress is called the karabela dress in Haitian creole.  Traditional male attire for dances, weddings, and other formal wear is the linen shirt jacket.

Saint Lucia
In Saint Lucia, the name of the dress is spelled Kwadril dress.

See also
Bush jacket
Kariba suit
Madras (costume)
National costume

References

Caribbean clothing
Jamaican culture
Haitian culture
Caribbean culture
Dresses
Folk costumes
Gowns